King Abdullah Park, formerly Al-Malaz Square, is an equestrian field-turned municipal park in the al-Malazz neighborhood of Riyadh, Saudi Arabia, located adjacent to Prince Faisal bin Fahd Stadium.

Popular for its 12-meter wide pedestrian corridor, 110-meter giant laser fountains and an artificial lake, the park gets flooded by visitors during festive seasons of Eid al-Fitr, Eid al-Adha and publicly organized events such as the Saudi National Day where the park also displays fireworks before midnight.

History

Al Malaz Square 
Soon after the establishment of Saudi Arabia in 1932 by King Abdulaziz, Al-Malaz Square held horse racing events for the monarch, which was his favorite sport and the locality surrounding it eventually got identified as 'Al Malaz'. After the ascension of King Saud in 1953, he initiated the relocation of government ministries from Jeddah to Riyadh and launched a housing project for the employees, thereby turning the area into an urban neighborhood between 1953 and 1957 and gradually making it hard for the sustainability of horse racing.

In 1965, with King Faisal's assent, Prince Abdullah and Prince Salman pushed for the establishment of the Equestrian Club in the square. Prince Salman instructed the Ministry of Labor and Social Affairs to issue a resolution for the establishment of the jockey club which was followed by a royal decree from King Faisal that handed over the club's presidency to Prince Abdullah. The square was also a popular destination for several foreign dignitaries and head of states between 1968 and 2002, including Queen Elizabeth II, Giovanni Leone, Indira Gandhi, Qaboos bin Said, Valéry d'Estaing, etc.

By the fall 1990s, al-Malaz had become a bustling commercial and residential neighborhood, which made it difficult for the square to host horse racing. In 1997, Crown Prince Abdullah instructed plans to relocate the Equestrian Club to the outskirts of Riyadh and intended the square to be turned into a public park and its preparation neared in 2001.

King Abdullah Park 

In 2003, Al Malaz Square was handed over to the Riyadh Municipality and it was announced that it would be soon turned into a public park.

In February 2010, the three-year project of the construction of the park was signed by Prince Salman, the 11th Governor of Riyadh at the time with Rawabi Fayfa for Agriculture and Contracting Company. The project was later monitored by his successor, Prince Sattam bin Abdulaziz al-Saud until his death in February 2013.

Inauguration

The inauguration of the park took place on October 2, 2013 by Prince Khalid bin Bandar al-Saud and Prince Turki bin Abdullah bin Abdulaziz al-Saud, the Governor and Deputy Governor of Riyadh respectively. The inauguration was attended by several high-ranking Saudi officials and foreign diplomats as well.

References

Parks in Riyadh
2013 establishments in Saudi Arabia